Sunnaginia is a tommotiid known from the Comely Limestone and elsewhere, and appears to represent one of the closest relatives to the brachiopod crown group, in a more derived position than Eccentrotheca.

See also
Sunnagyn

References

Prehistoric protostome genera
Cambrian animals of Europe
Paleozoic life of Nova Scotia

Cambrian genus extinctions